Elland railway station served the town of Elland in West Yorkshire, England until 1962.

History
The station was originally opened on 5 October 1840 by the Manchester and Leeds Railway. Upon the grouping in 1923, it became part of the London, Midland and Scottish Railway.

Elland station closed to passengers on 10 September 1962. Goods facilities were withdrawn on 28 June 1962.

Proposed reopening
Plans to reopen the station in 2000 (at the same time as Brighouse railway station) were cancelled due to lack of funds.

In 2006, Clayton Homes offered to build a station in return for planning permission for residential development. This did not materialise but Calderdale Council continued consulting on possible plans.

Reopening of the station is supported by the Halifax & District Rail Action Group and local campaign group "Give Elland a Rail Station". The New Stations Study undertaken for West Yorkshire Metro in 2014 found that Elland provided the strongest business case of a potential thirteen sites on the Calder Valley line, and was recommended for further study along with stations at Haxby, East Leeds/Thorpe Park, and Cross Hills, with a projected cost of reopening of £6 million.

In June 2017, the West Yorkshire Combined Authority allocated £20 million towards re-opening the station, with an estimated opening date of 2022.
In November 2017, the government announced Elland was one of four new stations proposed in the Government's ‘Connecting People: Strategic Vision for Rail’. In 2021, a planning application was submitted for two platforms, lifts, and a 116 space car park.

As of March 2023 the planning application for the new station has been approved and construction is expected to begin in 2024 for a potential opening date of 2025.

References

Notes

Sources

External links
Proposed Elland Railway Station Development Brief on the Calderdale Council website
 Elland station, to the right, on navigable 1947 O. S. map

Disused railway stations in Calderdale
Former Lancashire and Yorkshire Railway stations
Proposed railway stations in England
Railway stations in Great Britain closed in 1962
Railway stations in Great Britain opened in 1840
Elland